Michael Ambichl (born 26 April 1991) is an Austrian professional association football player.

External links 
 

1991 births
Living people
Austrian footballers
Austria youth international footballers
Association football midfielders
SKN St. Pölten players
Austrian Football Bundesliga players
People from Sankt Pölten
Footballers from Lower Austria
21st-century Austrian people